The 1993 Volvo International was a tennis tournament played on outdoor hard courts at the Cullman-Heyman Tennis Center in New Haven, Connecticut, United States and was part of the Championship Series of the 1993 ATP Tour. The tournament ran from August 16 through August 23, 1993. Stefan Edberg was the defending champion but lost in the second round to Daniel Vacek. Andriy Medvedev won in the final 7–5, 6–4 against Petr Korda.

Seeds
A champion seed is indicated in bold text while text in italics indicates the round in which that seed was eliminated. The top eight seeds received a bye to the second round.

  Stefan Edberg (second round)
  Ivan Lendl (quarterfinals)
  Richard Krajicek (third round)
  Petr Korda (final)
  Andriy Medvedev (champion)
  Henrik Holm (second round)
  Amos Mansdorf (third round)
  Mark Woodforde (quarterfinals)
  Arnaud Boetsch (first round)
  Andre Agassi (semifinals)
  Marc Rosset (third round)
  Marc-Kevin Goellner (first round)
  Jonas Svensson (quarterfinals)
  Richard Fromberg (first round)
  Jan Siemerink (first round)
  Carl-Uwe Steeb (first round)

Draw

Finals

Top half

Section 1

Section 2

Bottom half

Section 3

Section 4

References

Singles